Yambunera is a 2020 short stories collection by Bina Theeng. It was published on August 26, 2020 by Phoenix Books. It is the third book of the author. The book consists of 13 stories.

Synopsis 
Yambu is the name of Kathmandu in Tamang language. Yambunera means the area around Kathmandu valley. The stories in the book are centered in and around Kathmandu valley. The stories are about people who have been marginalized and been neglected by the state.

The stories included in the book are:

Theme 
The grief, suffering, suffering and struggle of the marginalized Tamang community is the main theme of this book. The book also shows various cultural evils of Nepalese society such as caste system, discrimination based on religion and class and patriarchy.

Reception 
The book received positive responses from the critics. Gyanu Adhikari of Shilapatra magazine praised the stories for being "grounded in social realism". Gauri Tamu praised the book as "breaking the so-called standard of Nepalese literature". Prakash Thamsuhang of Naya Patrika Daily called it as a "solid masterpiece".

See also 

 Kumari Prashnaharu
 Nathiya
 Dumero

References 

21st-century Nepalese books
2020 short story collections
Nepalese short story collections
Cultural depictions of Nepalese women
Nepali short story collections
Nepali-language books